Carrie Walton Penner (born August 12, 1970) is the granddaughter of Sam Walton the founder of Walmart, and the daughter of former company chairman S. Robson Walton.

Walton Penner is a powerful influence in the charter school movement.

Early life
She attended private school at The Governor's Academy in Newbury, Massachusetts.
She graduated prep school in 1988, and then went to Georgetown, and studied economics and history. In the mid-1990s, she was involved in education issues and earned a master's degree in Education Policy and Program Evaluation at Stanford University.

Career
Walton-Penner has been an education program officer for the Walton Family Foundation, an evaluator for the National Foundation for Teaching Entrepreneurship and served internships at the Rockefeller Foundation, Aaron Diamond Foundation, and Academy for Educational Development. She was also a research analyst for an evaluation of the Michigan Mathematics and Science Centers for Woodside Research Consortium.

On August 9, 2022, the NFL owners approved the purchase of the Denver Broncos by the Walton-Penner group (consisting of Walton Penner, her husband Greg, S. Robson Walton, Condoleezza Rice, Mellody Hobson, and Sir Lewis Hamilton). In her role, she is actively engaged with Broncos ownership and executives on all matters related to the organization.

Personal life
Walton-Penner is married to Greg Penner, who was named the Chairman of Walmart in 2015. They met while attending Georgetown University as undergraduates. They have four children and live in Atherton, California.

Board memberships
She is on the board of KIPP Foundation, Alliance for School Choice, and Charter School Growth Fund.

References

External links

Charter schools
Living people
Carrie Walton Penner
Georgetown University alumni
Stanford University alumni
1970 births
People from Atherton, California
Stanford University trustees
The Governor's Academy alumni